Melania Trump has been portrayed many times in popular culture.

Visual art and culture
Bosnian sculptor Stevo Selak created a statue of Trump in 2017. Madame Tussauds in New York City unveiled a wax sculpture of her in 2018. Jim Carrey drew a portrait of Trump in 2018. 

On 5 July 2019, a wooden statue carved out of a tree trunk with a chainsaw was unveiled by the Sava river in Rožno, near Trump's hometown Sevnica in Slovenia. The artwork was commissioned by U.S. artist Brad Downey, who hired a local craftsman and artist Aleš Župevc (aka Maxi) to create the statue. The statue is styled after the blue dress she wore during her husband's (Donald Trump) presidential inauguration in 2017. Local reception of the statue was mixed; some residents praised it, while others called it a "disgrace" and likened it to Smurfette. In July 2020, the statue was torched and removed for its protection. However, later in 2020 it was replaced with a lookalike statue in bronze.

Parodies

Television
Trump has been parodied many times on Saturday Night Live, mostly by Cecily Strong. In an interview with Vanity Fair, Strong stated she has "heard through the grapevine" Trump enjoys the parody. Maya Rudolph has also impersonated her, and Paris Hilton portrayed Trump when she hosted Saturday Night Live.

In July 2016, actress Laura Benanti played Trump on The Late Show with Stephen Colbert, satirizing her 2016 Republican National Convention speech that had accusations of plagiarism. Benanti has reprised the role several times since, including dressing as "the Ghost of Colonialism" for Halloween, and for Christmas skits. During the American Music Awards of 2016, Gigi Hadid impersonated her.

In 2018, Aquaria impersonated Trump during the Snatch Game challenge on the tenth season of RuPaul's Drag Race. Plastique Tiara impersonated her in the season 11 episode "Trump: The Rusical" (2019). On Our Cartoon President, Trump is voiced by Cody Lindquist and on The President Show, she is voiced by Mila Filatova.

Music videos
In October 2018, rapper T.I. released a music video with a Melania Trump lookalike dancing naked in a fake Oval Office. Trump's then-communications director Stephanie Grisham responded, "Like it or not, she is the first lady and this is the White House. It's disrespectful and disgusting to portray her this way simply because of politics. These kinds of vulgar attacks only further the divisiveness and bias in our country – it needs to stop."

Film
In the 2020 Sacha Baron Cohen film Borat Subsequent Moviefilm, a Disney-like parody of Melania is idolized as the ultimate dream for an Eastern European girl, to be married off to an older American man and live in a "golden cage".

Literature
In the erotic novel Melania: Devourer of Men (2018), Melania Trump is depicted as a manananggal, a creature from Philippine mythology, who must keep her identity hidden after her husband becomes president.

Theatre
Gina Gershon portrayed Trump in the off-Broadway show The Trump Family Special. She previously played her in Funny or Die skits.

See also
 Cultural depictions of Ivanka Trump
 Melania Trump replacement conspiracy theory
 Saturday Night Live parodies of Donald Trump

References